During 1942–43 season'Associazione Calcio Torino competed in Serie A and Coppa.

Summary
At the start of the 1942–43 season, available to Hungarian András Kuttik, there's a squad that includes top players: experts goalkeepers Bodoira and Cavalli; defenders of expertise such as Ferrini, Ellena and quality like Piacentini and Cassano; in midfield the veterans Baldi and Gallea, with the new Ezio Loik and Mazzola; forward Menti and Ferraris, without forgetting Gabetto and Ossola.

On paper Torino is the team to beat, but the departure is not the best: the Bull is to compete with surprise Livorno. This duel creates a thrilling championship, solved only on the final day when Torino, with a goal of Mazzola, sunk Bari.

Torino also managed to win the Coppa Italia against their "terrible" Venezia of the year before and became the first team to hit the "double". The game is played in Milan and the Granata, thanks to a brace from Gabetto and goals from Mazzola and Ferraris II, get the win with a resounding 4–0.

Squad 

 (Captain)

 (vice-Captain)

Transfers

Competitions

Serie A

League table

Matches

Coppa Italia

Round of 32

Eightfinals

Quarterfinals

Semifinals

Final

Statistics

Squad statistics

Players statistics

Appearances
18.Fioravante Baldi 
20.Alfredo Bodoira 
17.Luigi Cassano 
15.Filippo Cavalli 
32.Giacinto Ellena 
35.Pietro Ferraris 
26.Osvaldo Ferrini 
31.Guglielmo Gabetto 
20.Cesare Gallea 
35.Giuseppe Grezar
35.Ezio Loik 
35.Valentino Mazzola 
23.Romeo Menti 
16.Franco Ossola 
27.Sergio Piacentini

Goalscorers
18.Guglielmo Gabetto 
16.Valentino Mazzola 
14.Pietro Ferraris 
10.Ezio Loik 
9.Franco Ossola 
8.Romeo Menti 
1.Fioravante Baldi 
3.Giuseppe Grezar 
1.Sergio Piacentini

See also
 Grande Torino

References

External links
 
 

Torino F.C. seasons
Torino
Italian football championship-winning seasons